Chris Finch (born November 6, 1969) is an American professional basketball coach and former player who is the current head coach for the Minnesota Timberwolves of the National Basketball Association (NBA). He was previously an assistant coach for the Houston Rockets, Denver Nuggets, New Orleans Pelicans and Toronto Raptors of the National Basketball Association (NBA).

Playing career

College
Finch is a 1992 graduate of Franklin & Marshall College in Lancaster, Pennsylvania, where he was an NCAA Division III All-American in 1991 and 1992. In 1991, as one of the best defenders in the nation's third division, he helped lead the F&M Diplomats to the NCAA Division III championship game in Springfield, Ohio, where the team lost to Wisconsin-Platteville. Finch ranks among the school's all-time leaders in points, rebounds, assists, blocks and steals.

Professional
Finch began his playing career in England, with the Sheffield Forgers of the then second-tier of British basketball, the National Basketball League. Before the 1994–95 season, Finch and Sheffield moved into the first-tier of British basketball, the British Basketball League.

Coaching career

Sheffield Sharks
Finch started his head coaching career in England, with the Sheffield Sharks of the British Basketball League, the same team that he played on during his pro playing career. He led them to several titles during his tenure, making the franchise the most successful in league history. After winning the regular season title with Sheffield in the 1998–99 season, he was named the BBL Coach of the Year.

Gießen 46ers
He then moved to Germany for a fresh challenge, where he was the head coach of the Gießen 46ers, in the German Basketball Bundesliga. The team had a horrible year, and Finch was fired, after having a record of 4–13, with the team being on the verge of relegation.

Euphony Bree
After his unsuccessful time in Germany, Finch moved to Belgium, where he was the head coach of Euphony Bree. He led Bree to their first and only Belgian Basketball League championship in 2005.

Dexia Mons-Hainaut
In 2007, Finch moved to Euphony Bree's Belgian Basketball League rivals, Dexia Mons-Hainaut, bringing several players with him and his successful assistant coach Johan Roijakkers. With Finch in charge, Dexia Mons-Hainaut reached the final of the EuroChallenge 2007–08, where they lost to BK Barons Riga by a single point.

Rio Grande Valley Vipers
In 2009, Finch became the head coach of the Rio Grande Valley Vipers, of the NBA D-League. Under Finch, the Vipers went 34–16, finishing in first place in the Western Conference, and earned the franchise's first playoff berth. In the playoffs, the Vipers beat both Reno and Austin in 3 games, and swept Tulsa in the Finals to earn the franchise's first championship. Finch was named the D-League Coach of Year.

Houston Rockets
Finch was hired as an Assistant Coach for the Houston Rockets in 2011. After Kevin McHale was fired in 2015 and J. B. Bickerstaff replaced him on an interim basis, Finch was named Associate Head Coach.

Denver Nuggets
Finch was officially hired by the Denver Nuggets August 8, 2016 as the Associate Head Coach alongside Mike Malone.

New Orleans Pelicans
Finch was officially hired by the New Orleans Pelicans on June 8, 2017 as the associate head coach alongside Alvin Gentry. On November 16, 2020, Finch was not retained by the Pelicans.

Toronto Raptors
On December 4, 2020, he was officially announced as a new member of the coaching staff for the Toronto Raptors, where he served as assistant coach to Nick Nurse, who had served under him at the 2012 Summer Olympics.

Minnesota Timberwolves
On February 22, 2021, the Minnesota Timberwolves named Finch as the team's new head coach. On April 11, 2022, he received a multi-year extension.

Head coaching record

|- 
| style="text-align:left;"|Minnesota
| style="text-align:left;"|
| 41||16||25|||| style="text-align:center;"|4th in Northwest||—||—||—||—
| style="text-align:center;"|Missed playoffs
|- class="sortbottom"
| style="text-align:left;"|Minnesota
| style="text-align:left;"|
| 82||46||36||||style="text-align:center;"|3rd in Northwest||6||2||4||
| align="center"|Lost in First Round
|- class="sortbottom"
| style="text-align:center;" colspan="2"|Career
| 123||62||61|||| ||6||2||4||||

National team career
Finch also coached the Great Britain Men's National Team at the FIBA EuroBasket 2009, FIBA EuroBasket 2011, and the 2012 Summer Olympics. He resigned after his team was eliminated from the Olympics to focus on his NBA coaching career.

References

1969 births
Living people
American expatriate basketball people in Belgium
American expatriate basketball people in Germany
American expatriate basketball people in the United Kingdom
American men's basketball coaches
American men's basketball players
Basketball coaches from Ohio
Basketball players from Ohio
British Olympic coaches
Denver Nuggets assistant coaches
Franklin & Marshall Diplomats men's basketball players
Giessen 46ers coaches
Great Britain men's national basketball team coaches
Houston Rockets assistant coaches
New Orleans Pelicans assistant coaches
Rio Grande Valley Vipers coaches
Sheffield Sharks players
Shooting guards
Small forwards
Toronto Raptors assistant coaches